The Scarlet Letter is a 1922 British silent drama film directed by Challis Sanderson and starring Sybil Thorndike, Tony Fraser and Dick Webb. It is an adaptation of the 1850 novel The Scarlet Letter by Nathaniel Hawthorne.

Cast
 Sybil Thorndike as Hester Prynne 
 Tony Fraser as Pastor Dimmesdale 
 Dick Webb as Roger Chillingworth

References

External links

1922 films
1922 drama films
British drama films
Films directed by Challis Sanderson
Films set in Massachusetts
Films based on The Scarlet Letter
British silent short films
British black-and-white films
1920s English-language films
1920s British films
Silent drama films